The maximal ergodic theorem is a theorem in ergodic theory, a discipline within mathematics.

Suppose that  is a probability space, that  is a (possibly noninvertible) measure-preserving transformation, and that . Define  by

Then the maximal ergodic theorem states that

for any λ ∈ R.

This theorem is used to prove the point-wise ergodic theorem.

References 
 .

Probability theorems
Ergodic theory
Theorems in dynamical systems